The Tunisian Basketball Federation (FTBB) is the governing body of basketball in Tunisia. that was Formed in 1956, it is based in the capital town Tunis. The FTBB is a member of the International Basketball Federation (FIBA) and also belong to the FIBA Africa zone. The current president of the federation is Ali Benzarti.

Presidents

See also
Tunisia national basketball team
Tunisia A' national basketball team
Tunisia women's national basketball team
Tunisia men's national under-20 basketball team
Tunisia national under-19 basketball team
Tunisia national under-17 basketball team
Tunisia women's national under-20 basketball team
Tunisia women's national under-19 basketball team
Tunisia women's national under-17 basketball team
Tunisia national 3x3 team
Tunisia women's national 3x3 team
Tunisian Division I Basketball League
Tunisian Basketball Cup

References

External links
 Official website 

Basketball
Federation
Sports organizations established in 1956
1956 establishments in Tunisia
National members of FIBA Africa